6300 series may refer to:

Train types 

 Toei 6300 series electric multiple unit
 Hankyu 6300 series electric multiple unit